This is a list of United States Army Air Forces B-24 Liberator combat units during World War II including variants and other historical information.  Heavy bomber training organizations primarily under II Bomber Command in the United States and non-combat units are not included.

The USAAF took delivery of its first B-24As in June 1941, although the B-24D was the first production model delivered in quantity in July 1942.  B-24s were assigned to every combat Air Force; at peak inventory, the USAAF had 6,043 B-24 Liberators operating worldwide in September 1944.

Following the end of World War II, the Liberator was rapidly withdrawn from USAAF service, being replaced by the Boeing B-29 Superfortress. Literally thousands of Liberators were flown to various disposal units where they were cut up for scrap. Some brand-new late-production B-24Ms from Convair/San Diego and Ford/Willow Run were flown directly from the factory to various reclamation sites such as the scrapyard at RFC Kingman, Arizona in 1945, as the war in Europe had ended and B-29s were doing most of the long-range bombing work in the Pacific.

Only a few Liberators were still around when the United States Air Force was formed in 1947, most of them being used for various research purposes. The last USAF Liberator, a Ford EZB-24M-20-FO serial number 44-51228 used by the Aeronautical Icing Research Laboratory for ice research, was struck off the rolls in 1953.  For a time, it was on display at Lackland AFB, Texas, with the armament and gunner positions restored. It is currently at the American Museum at Duxford Aerodrome, England painted as 44-50492, a B-24M that was assigned to the 392d Bombardment Group, 578th Bombardment Squadron.

Combat Organizations

Army Air Forces Antisubmarine Command
Established in October 1942 to deal with the U-boat threat; formed largely from the resources of I Bomber Command.  Inactivated in August 1943 when antisubmarine mission was taken over by the United States Navy.

 1st Search Attack Group
 October 1942–August 1943; Langley Field, Virginia
 2d Search Attack Squadron
 3d Search Attack Squadron
 4th Search Attack Squadron
 Became radar training unit for USAAF, inactivated April 1944

 304th Bombardment Group
 October–December 1942Langley Field, Virginia Its Bombardment Squadrons were redesignated as Antisubmarine Squadrons serving in the USA with the 25th & 26 th Wings. The 19th ARON went to the UK when the 479th AG was activated
 1st Antisubmarine Squadron
 18th Antisubmarine Squadron
 19th Antisubmarine Squadron

 26th Antisubmarine Wing
 November 1942–October 1943; Miami Airport, Florida
 15th Antisubmarine Squadron
Plus many more.
 Inactivated October 1943

 479th Antisubmarine Group
 July–November 1943; England (Several stations)
 4th Antisubmarine Squadron
 6th Antisubmarine Squadron
 19th Antisubmarine Squadron
 22d Antisubmarine Squadron
 Inactivated November 1943; Aircraft VIIIAFSC. Some returned to US and transferred to Pacific and CBI. Others to CB-24/C-87. Still others to 8th AF special operations.

 480th Antisubmarine Group
 June–November 1943; Port Lyautey, French Morocco
 1st Antisubmarine Squadron
 2d Antisubmarine Squadron
 Inactivated 1943. Inventory returned to USA.

FOOTNOTE: Seventy-seven domestic Antisubmarine B-24D were transferred to the USN as PB4Y-1 in exchange for future allocations.

Fifth Air Force
Originally formed as the Philippine Department Air Force in August 1941; Stationed in the Southwest Pacific Area (SWPA) of the Asiatic-Pacific Theater Operating in the Far East, Australia, New Guinea and Philippines.  Participated in halting the Japanese drive in Papua, recovery of New Guinea, liberation of the Philippines and the Battle of Okinawa and Formosa. 

 22nd Bombardment Group
 Transitioned from B-25/B-26 to B-24s at Nadzab, New Guinea in February 1944
 Operated from Netherlands East Indies, Philippines, Okinawa
 2d Bombardment Squadron
 19th Bombardment Squadron
 33d Bombardment Squadron
 408th Bombardment Squadron
 Re-equipped with B-29s, May 1946 on Okinawa

 43d Bombardment Group
 Equipped with B-17s in 1941; Deployed to Australia March 1942
 Transitioned to B-24s at Port Moresby, New Guinea between May and September 1943.
 Operated from Netherlands East Indies, Philippines, Okinawa
 63d Bombardment Squadron
 64th Bombardment Squadron
 65th Bombardment Squadron
 403d Bombardment Squadron

The 63rd BS specialized in sea search and attack.
 Inactivated 1946

 90th Bombardment Group
 Activated with B-24s in April 1942, Deployed to Australia in November 1942
 Operated from Australia, Netherlands East Indies, Philippines, Okinawa
 319th Bombardment Squadron
 320th Bombardment Squadron
 321st Bombardment Squadron
 400th Bombardment Squadron
 Inactivated 1946

 380th Bombardment Group
 Activated with B-24s in November 1942; Deployed to Australia
 Attached to RAAF until January 1944, then Philippines, Okinawa
 528th Bombardment Squadron
 529th Bombardment Squadron
 530th Bombardment Squadron
 531st Bombardment Squadron
 Inactivated 1946

 20th Combat Mapping Squadron
 Activated with F-7As in October 1943 (later flew F-7B/F-7B H2X)
 Operated from Australia, Netherlands East Indies, Philippines, Okinawa, Occupied Japan
 Inactivated 1946

Sixth Air Force
Sixth Air Force begin in February 1917, formally established as Panama Canal Air Force in October 1940. Control of USAAF operations in the Caribbean. Primarily flew antisubmarine patrols over both the Caribbean and Eastern Pacific Ocean approaches to the Panama Canal.

 6th Bombardment Group
 Received LB-30s (March 1942) and B-24Ds (September 1942)
 3d Bombardment Squadron
 25th Bombardment Squadron
 29th Bombardment Squadron
 74th Bombardment Squadron
 395th Bombardment Squadron
 397th Bombardment Squadron
 6th BG reassigned to United States in November 1943; B-24s remained with various 6th AF squadrons under VI Bomber Command until 1946

Seventh Air Force
Initially formed as the Hawaiian Air Force in October 1940. Operated primarily in Central Pacific Area (CPA) of the Pacific Ocean Areas under USN  control until July, 1945 when assigned to FEAF.

 11th Bombardment Group
 Transitioned from B-17s to B-24s at Hickam Field, Hawaii Territory in April 1943.
 Operated in Gilbert Islands, Marshall Islands, Northern Marianas Islands, Okinawa
 26th Bombardment Squadron
 42d Bombardment Squadron
 98th Bombardment Squadron
 431st Bombardment Squadron
 Inactivated 1945

30th Bombardment Group
 Received LB-30s in 1941, B-24s in 1942 at March Field, California Moved to Pacific, 1943.
 Operated in Gilbert Islands, Marshall Islands, Northern Marianas Islands
 27th Bombardment Squadron
 38th Bombardment Squadron
 392d Bombardment Squadron
 819th Bombardment Squadron
 Inactivated 1946

494th Bombardment Group
 Activated with B-24J in December 1943
 Operated in Palau Islands, Okinawa
 864th Bombardment Squadron
 865th Bombardment Squadron
 866th Bombardment Squadron
 867th Bombardment Squadron

373 BS attached, July 1945 to provide sea search capabilities to VII BC, FEAF.
 Inactivated 1945

86th Combat Mapping Squadron
 Received F-7A/Bs at Wheeler Field, Hawaii Territory, early 1944
 Operated from Kwajalein, Saipan, Eniwetok, Palawan
 Inactivated 1946

Eighth Air Force
Was primary heavy bombardment Air Force in the European Theater of Operations (ETO) during World War II,  stationed in England.  Mission was conducting long-range strategic bomber offensive against Occupied Europe and Nazi Germany. The first Liberator mission from England took place on October 9, 1942.   Several VIII Bomber Command Liberator groups deployed aircraft to Libya in late 1942 and 1943 to augment IX Bomber Command and carry out attacks against Axis targets in the Mediterranean.  Ultimately a total of twenty-one Liberator-equipped groups were deployed and operated with the Eighth Air Force 2d and 3d Bombardment Divisions. 

 34th Bombardment Group
 RAF Mendlesham, April 1944-July 1945
 4th Bombardment Squadron
 7th Bombardment Squadron
 18th Bombardment Squadron
 391st Bombardment Squadron
 Converted to B-17s, September 1944

 44th Bombardment Group
 RAF Shipdham, October 1942-June 1945
 Deployed to Ninth Air Force, June–August 1943
 Participated in August 1, 1943 Attack on Ploesti Oilfields, Romania
 66th Bombardment Squadron
 67th Bombardment Squadron
 68th Bombardment Squadron
 404th Bombardment Squadron
 Converted to B-29s

 93d Bombardment Group
 RAF Hardwick, December 1942-May 1945
 Deployed to Ninth Air Force, December 1942-August 1943
 Participated in August 1, 1943 Attack on Ploesti Oilfields, Romania
 328th Bombardment Squadron
 329th Bombardment Squadron
 330th Bombardment Squadron
 409th Bombardment Squadron
 Inactivated December 1945

 389th Bombardment Group
 RAF Hethel, June 1943–May 1945
 Deployed to Ninth Air Force, July–August 1943
 Participated in August 1, 1943 Attack on Ploesti Oilfields, Romania
 564th Bombardment Squadron
 565th Bombardment Squadron
 566th Bombardment Squadron
 567th Bombardment Squadron
 Inactivated September 1945

 392d Bombardment Group
 RAF Wendling, July 1943–June 1945
 576th Bombardment Squadron
 577th Bombardment Squadron
 578th Bombardment Squadron
 579th Bombardment Squadron
 Inactivated September 1945

 445th Bombardment Group
 RAF Tibenham, November 1943-May 1945
 700th Bombardment Squadron
 701st Bombardment Squadron
 702d Bombardment Squadron
 703d Bombardment Squadron
 Inactivated September 1945

 446th Bombardment Group
 RAF Bungay, November 1943-July 1945
 704th Bombardment Squadron
 705th Bombardment Squadron
 706th Bombardment Squadron
 707th Bombardment Squadron
 Inactivated August 1945

 447th Bombardment Group
 RAF Attlebridge, March 1944-July 1945
 708th Bombardment Squadron
 709th Bombardment Squadron
 710th Bombardment Squadron
 711th Bombardment Squadron
 Converted to B-17s, Summer 1944

 448th Bombardment Group
 RAF Seething, December 1943-July 1945
 712th Bombardment Squadron
 713th Bombardment Squadron
 714th Bombardment Squadron
 715th Bombardment Squadron
 Converted to B-29s

 453d Bombardment Group
 RAF Old Buckenham, December 1943-May 1945
 732d Bombardment Squadron
 733d Bombardment Squadron
 734th Bombardment Squadron
 735th Bombardment Squadron
 Inactivated August 1945

 458th Bombardment Group
 RAF Horsham St. Faith, January 1944-June 1945
 752d Bombardment Squadron
 753d Bombardment Squadron
 754th Bombardment Squadron
 755th Bombardment Squadron
 Converted to B-29s

 466th Bombardment Group
 RAF Attlebridge, March 1944-July 1945
 784th Bombardment Squadron
 785th Bombardment Squadron
 786th Bombardment Squadron
 787th Bombardment Squadron
 Inactivated July 1945

 467th Bombardment Group
 RAF Rackheath, March 1944-June 1945
 788th Bombardment Squadron
 789th Bombardment Squadron
 790th Bombardment Squadron
 791st Bombardment Squadron
 Converted to B-29s

 482d Bombardment Group (Pathfinder)
 RAF Alconbury, August 1943-May 1945
 Attached to: VIII Composite Command, February 1944-January 1945
 Composite group with 2 squadrons of B-17s and one of B-24s
 Conducted Pathfinder missions using H2X radar
 812th Bombardment Squadron (B-17)
 813th Bombardment Squadron (B-17)
 814th Bombardment Squadron (B-24)
 Inactivated September 1945

 486th Bombardment Group
 RAF Sudbury, April–November 1944
 832d Bombardment Squadron
 833d Bombardment Squadron
 834th Bombardment Squadron
 835th Bombardment Squadron
 Converted to B-17s, August 1944

 487th Bombardment Group
 RAF Lavenham, April 1944–February 1945
 836th Bombardment Squadron
 837th Bombardment Squadron
 838th Bombardment Squadron
 839th Bombardment Squadron
 Converted to B-17s, July 1944

 489th Bombardment Group
 RAF Halesworth, May–November 1944
 844th Bombardment Squadron
 845th Bombardment Squadron
 846th Bombardment Squadron
 847th Bombardment Squadron
 Converted to B-29s, December 1944

 490th Bombardment Group
 RAF Eye, May 1944-October 1944
 848th Bombardment Squadron
 849th Bombardment Squadron
 850th Bombardment Squadron
 851st Bombardment Squadron
 Converted to B-17s, August 1944

 491st Bombardment Group
 RAF Metfield, RAF North Pickenham, April 1944-July 1945
 852d Bombardment Squadron
 853d Bombardment Squadron
 854th Bombardment Squadron
 855th Bombardment Squadron
 Inactivated September 1945

 492d Bombardment Group
 Unit deployed to RAF North Pickenham, January 1944. Re-designation of 801st Bombardment Group (Provisional), August 1944.  Unit at RAF Harrington until August 1945.
 856th Bombardment Squadron
 857th Bombardment Squadron
 858th Bombardment Squadron
 859th Bombardment Squadron
 Converted to B-29s, August 1945

 493d Bombardment Group
 RAF Debach, RAF Wormingford, April 1944-August 1945
 860th Bombardment Squadron
 861st Bombardment Squadron
 862d Bombardment Squadron
 863d Bombardment Squadron
 Converted to B-17s, May 1944

Ninth Air Force
IX Bomber Command operated Liberators from airfields in Egypt; Libya and Tunisia during the Western Desert Campaign (1942–1943).   Transferred B-24s to Twelfth Air Force in October 1943; reassigned to England to become tactical air force supporting American First Army (IX Tactical Air Command), Third Army (XIX Tactical Air Command), and Ninth Army (XXIX Tactical Air Command).

 98th Bombardment Group
 Deployed to Middle East July 1942, First B-24Ds to be deployed overseas (Halverson Detachment)
 Stationed in BritishPalestine, Egypt, Libya, Tunisia
 Participated in August 1, 1943 Attack on Ploesti Oilfields, Romania
 343d Bombardment Squadron
 344th Bombardment Squadron
 345th Bombardment Squadron
 415th Bombardment Squadron
 Transferred to Twelfth (October), then Fifteenth Air Force, November 1943

 376th Bombardment Group
 Deployed to Middle East October 1942
 Stationed in BritishPalestine, Egypt, Libya, Tunisia
 Participated in August 1, 1943 Attack on Ploesti Oilfields, Romania
 512th Bombardment Squadron
 513th Bombardment Squadron
 514th Bombardment Squadron
 515th Bombardment Squadron
 Transferred to Twelfth (October), then Fifteenth Air Force, November 1943

Tenth Air Force
Constituted February 1942. Moved to India March–May 1942. Primary USAAF Air Force in the China-Burma-India theater.
 7th Bombardment Group
 Formed September 1918; deployed to Philippines September 1940; withdrawn to Australia late December 1941; combat in Java Jan-March 1942; deployed to India. Transitioned from B-17C/Ds to B-24s at Karachi, March 1942
 9th Bombardment Squadron
 436th Bombardment Squadron
 492d Bombardment Squadron
 493d Bombardment Squadron
 Inactivated December 1945

Eleventh Air Force
Formed February 1942. Based in Alaska Territory.  Engaged in combat with B-24s during Aleutian Campaign (1942–1943).  First B-24 raid on Japanese Home Islands in 1943.
 28th Composite Group
 Received LB-30s and B-24s at Elmendorf Field, Alaska, 1942
 21st Bombardment Squadron
 36th Bombardment Squadron
 404th Bombardment Squadron
 Inactivated October 1945

Twelfth Air Force
Formed November 1942.  Operated B-24s in Algeria, Tunisia and Sicily.   Transferred Liberators to Fifteenth Air Force in November 1943, becoming tactical air force in Mediterranean Theater of Operations (MTO) primarily supporting Fifth Army (XII Tactical Air Command) in Italy, also operating in Southern France and Germany supporting Seventh Army.

 Twelfth Air Force had several B-17 Flying Fortress groups which were transferred from VIII Bomber Command in England when the command was formed in the fall of 1942.  In Tunisia, the Liberator-equipped 98th and 376th Bombardment Groups were briefly transferred from Ninth Air Force in October 1943 to the command.  All of Twelfth AF's heavy bomb groups were reassigned to Fifteenth Air Force in November.

Thirteenth Air Force
Formed on December 14, 1942. Operated primarily in South Pacific Area (SPA) of the Pacific Theater of Operations (PTO)

 5th Bombardment Group
 Unit formed in 1915. Large number of B-18s and B-17C/Ds destroyed during Pearl Harbor Attack; surviving B-17s sent to New Hebrides in 1942.  Re-equipped in Hawaii with B-24s and redeployed in August 1943
 Stationed in Solomon Islands, Admiralty Islands, Netherlands East Indies, Schouten Islands, Molucca Islands, Philippines
 23d Bombardment Squadron
 31st Bombardment Squadron
 72d Bombardment Squadron
 394th Bombardment Squadron
 Transitioned to RB-29s in 1946

 307th Bombardment Group
 Established with B-17s in April 1942; transitioned to B-24s at Hickam Field, November 1942
 Stationed in Solomon Islands, Admiralty Islands, Netherlands East Indies, Philippines
 370th Bombardment Squadron
 371st Bombardment Squadron
 372d Bombardment Squadron
 424th Bombardment Squadron
 Transitioned to B-29s in 1946

 868th Bombardment Squadron
 Established in July 1943 with SB-24 RADAR aircraft; assigned directly to 13th AF Headquarters. Flew low level, anti-shipping strikes under the cover of darkness. Also flew as pathfinders for high-altitude bombers. Special missions were flown against land targets at night and one of the intentions was to prevent the Japanese from sleeping.    Stationed in  Solomon Islands, Admiralty Islands, Schouten Islands, Netherlands East Indies, Philippines, Okinawa.  Inactivated December 1945

Fourteenth Air Force
Formed out of the American Volunteer Group in March 1943 in Kunming, China. Primary United States Air Force in China as part of the China-Burma-India Theater

 308th Bombardment Group
 Formed with B-24s in April 1942; deployed to China in March 1943
 373d Bombardment Squadron
 374th Bombardment Squadron
 375th Bombardment Squadron
 425th Bombardment Squadron
 Inactivated October 1945

Fifteenth Air Force
Activated in Tunisia on November 1, 1943. Primary strategic bombardment Air Force of the Mediterranean Theater of Operations (MTO) operating from airfields in Southern Italy. Had 15 B-24 groups. Bombing raids against targets in Italy, then took part in raids on Germany, Austria, Hungary, Yugoslavia, and Romania. Supported the invasion of southern France.

 449th Bombardment Group
 Grottaglie Airfield, January 1944-May 1945
 716th Bombardment Squadron
 717th Bombardment Squadron
 718th Bombardment Squadron
 719th Bombardment Squadron
 Transitioned to B-29s, May 1945

 450th Bombardment Group
 Manduria Airfield, December 1943-May 1945
 720th Bombardment Squadron
 721st Bombardment Squadron
 722d Bombardment Squadron
 723d Bombardment Squadron
 Transitioned to B-29s, May 1945

 451st Bombardment Group
 Gioia del Colle Airfield, January 1944; San Pancrazio Airfield, March 1944; Castelltuccio Airfield, April 1944-June 1945
 724th Bombardment Squadron
 725th Bombardment Squadron
 726th Bombardment Squadron
 727th Bombardment Squadron
 Inactivated September 1945

 454th Bombardment Group
 San Giovanni Airfield, January 1944-July 1945
 736th Bombardment Squadron
 737th Bombardment Squadron
 738th Bombardment Squadron
 739th Bombardment Squadron
 Transitioned to B-29s, August 1945

 455th Bombardment Group
 San Giovanni Airfield, January 1944-September 1945
 740th Bombardment Squadron
 741st Bombardment Squadron
 742d Bombardment Squadron
 743d Bombardment Squadron
 Inactivated September 1945

 456th Bombardment Group
 Stornara Airfield, January 1944-July 1945
 744th Bombardment Squadron
 745th Bombardment Squadron
 746th Bombardment Squadron
 747th Bombardment Squadron
 Transitioned to B-29s, August 1945

 459th Bombardment Group
 Giulia Airfield, February 1944-July 1945
 756th Bombardment Squadron
 757th Bombardment Squadron
 758th Bombardment Squadron
 759th Bombardment Squadron
 Inactivated August 1945

 460th Bombardment Group
 Spinazzola Airfield, February 1944-June 1945
 760th Bombardment Squadron
 761st Bombardment Squadron
 762d Bombardment Squadron
 763d Bombardment Squadron
 Transferred to Air Transport Command for Green Project transport of troops from Europe to United States, June 1945
 Inactivated July 1945

 461st Bombardment Group
 Torretto Airfield, February 1944-July 1945
 764th Bombardment Squadron
 765th Bombardment Squadron
 766th Bombardment Squadron
 767th Bombardment Squadron
 Inactivated August 1945

 464th Bombardment Group
 Pantanella Airfield, March 1944-May 1945
 776th Bombardment Squadron
 777th Bombardment Squadron
 778th Bombardment Squadron
 779th Bombardment Squadron
 Transferred to Air Transport Command for Green Project transport of troops from Europe to United States, May 1945
 Inactivated July 1945

 465th Bombardment Group
 Pantanella Airfield, April 1944-June 1945
 780th Bombardment Squadron
 781st Bombardment Squadron
 782d Bombardment Squadron
 783d Bombardment Squadron
 Transferred to Air Transport Command for Green Project transport of troops from Europe to United States, June 1945
 Inactivated July 1945

 484th Bombardment Group
 Torretto Airfield, April 1944-May 1945
 824th Bombardment Squadron
 825th Bombardment Squadron
 826th Bombardment Squadron
 827th Bombardment Squadron
 Transferred to Air Transport Command for Green Project transport of troops from Europe to United States, May 1945
 Inactivated July 1945

 485th Bombardment Group
 Venosa Airfield, April 1944-May 1945
 828th Bombardment Squadron
 829th Bombardment Squadron
 830th Bombardment Squadron
 831st Bombardment Squadron
 Transitioned to B-29s, August 1945

 98th Bombardment Group; 376th Bombardment Group
 Previously served with both the Ninth and Twelfth Air Forces before being assigned to the Fifteenth Air Force in November 1943.  Stationed in Tunisia and later Southern Italy.  Inactivated November 1945.

 2641st Special Group (Provisional)
 Assigned directly to 15th AF Headquarters.  Flew B-17s, B-24s and other aircraft types as needed.  Engaged in special operations in the Mediterranean Theater of Operations, December 1944-May 1945
 859th Bombardment Squadron
 885th Bombardment Squadron

Twentieth Air Force
Constituted April 1944. Primarily equipped with Boeing B-29 Superfortresses but there were two reconnaissance squadrons equipped with B-24s and F-7s that were stationed on the Northern Mariana Islands.  Both units reported to XXI Bomber Command Headquarters.

 3d Reconnaissance Squadron
 Active September 1944-September 1945.
 Flew photographic, electronic, and weather reconnaissance missions in Western Pacific
 55th Weather Reconnaissance Squadron
 Activated as 655th Reconnaissance Squadron, January 1945; redesignated June 1945.
 Flew weather reconnaissance flights for XXI Bomber Command headquarters target and route planning for bombardment missions.  Inactivated April 1946.

References

 Maurer, Maurer (1983). Air Force Combat Units Of World War II. Maxwell AFB, AL: Office of Air Force History. .

External links
 "Strawberry Bitch"

Liberator
Lists of military units and formations of World War II
Military units and formations of the United States Army Air Forces
United States Army Air Forces lists
United States in World War II-related lists
World War II strategic bombing units